The Newberry Historic District is a historic district in Newberry, South Carolina, United States. Among its thirty-five contributing properties is a building dating back to 1789.  It was listed on the National Register of Historic Places in 1974.

It includes the Old Courthouse and Newberry Opera House, which are separately NRHP-listed.

References

Newberry, South Carolina
Historic districts on the National Register of Historic Places in South Carolina
National Register of Historic Places in Newberry County, South Carolina
Historic districts in Newberry County, South Carolina